Chuvash-Ulkanovo (Sıwaş-Olqan) is a rural locality (a village) in Tatar-Ulkanovsky Selsoviet, Tuymazinsky District, Bashkortostan, Russia. The population was 158 as of 2010. There are 4 streets.

Geography 
Chuvash-Ulkanovo is located 14 km northeast of Tuymazy (the district's administrative centre) by road. Kiska-Yelga is the nearest rural locality.

References 

Rural localities in Tuymazinsky District